Anna Poddubskaia (born 27 October 1985) is a Russian para taekwondo practitioner. She won one of the bronze medals in the women's 49 kg event at the 2020 Summer Paralympics in Tokyo, Japan. She competed at the Summer Paralympics under the flag of the Russian Paralympic Committee.

References

Living people
1985 births
People from Tuapse
Russian female taekwondo practitioners
Taekwondo practitioners at the 2020 Summer Paralympics
Medalists at the 2020 Summer Paralympics
Paralympic bronze medalists for the Russian Paralympic Committee athletes
Paralympic medalists in taekwondo
Sportspeople from Krasnodar Krai
21st-century Russian women